Janine Hauser (born 6 May 2001) is a Swiss ice hockey player and member of the Swiss national team, currently playing in the Swiss Women's League (SWHL A) with the ZSC Lions Frauen.

Hauser represented Switzerland at the IIHF Women's World Championship in 2021 and 2022. As a junior player with the Swiss national under-18 team, she participated in the IIHF Women's U18 World Championships in 2016, 2017, 2018, and 2019. At the 2016 Winter Youth Olympics, she won a bronze medal with Switzerland in the girls' ice hockey tournament.

References

External links 
 
 

Living people
2001 births
Ice hockey players at the 2016 Winter Youth Olympics
People from Dietikon District
Sportspeople from the canton of Zürich
Swiss women's ice hockey defencemen
Swiss Women's League players
Youth Olympic bronze medalists for Switzerland